Le Parc (1985) is the twenty-sixth major release and fourteenth studio album to be recorded by electronic artists Tangerine Dream. Each track on the album is inspired by parks from around the world. Le Parc marked Tangerine Dream's last studio release with Johannes Schmoelling, who left the band in October 1985. The title track "Le Parc" was used as the theme for the short-lived U.S television series, Street Hawk. A video was produced for "Tiergarten". The track "Central Park" was used as the opening theme for the movie Diamond Ninja Force directed by Godfrey Ho.

According to Dave Connolly of AllMusic, Le Parc is in essence a series of "musical postcards" from major parks of the world that focus on the mood of these places rather than their geographical qualities. Its tracks are shorter and more lyrical than the band's earlier works. Connolly said Le Parc "operates on a superficial level", which might be "slightly distasteful" to some long-time fans.

Track listing

Personnel
 Christopher Franke
 Edgar Froese
 Johannes Schmoelling
 Clare Torry – vocals on "Yellowstone Park"
 Katja Brauneis – vocals on "Zen Garden"
 Robert Kastler – trumpets on "Bois de Boulogne"
 Christian Gstettner – computer programming
 Steffan Hartmann – computer programming
 Monica Froese – sleeve design

References

1985 albums
Tangerine Dream albums